Bridgend County Borough Council is the governing body for Bridgend County Borough, one of the Principal Areas of Wales.

History
Bridgend County Borough and Bridgend County Borough Council came into effect from 1 April 1996, following the Local Government (Wales) Act 1994. Bridgend County Borough Council largely replaced Ogwr Borough Council, though St Brides Major, Ewenny and Wick were transferred from Ogwr to the Vale of Glamorgan.

In November 2014 the council voted to propose a merger with the neighbouring Vale of Glamorgan Council, though this was rejected by the Welsh Government's Public Services Minister, Leighton Andrews, as not meeting the criteria to be able to proceed.

Political control
The first election to the council was held in 1995, initially operating as a shadow authority before coming into its powers on 1 April 1996. Political control of the council since 1996 has been held by the following parties:

Leadership
The leaders of the council since 2004 have been:

Current composition
As of 12 August 2022.

Party with majority control in bold

Elections
Since 2012, elections take place every five years.

Party with the most elected councillors in bold. Coalition agreements in notes column.

Prior to the May 2008 elections Bridgend Council was run by a coalition of Liberal Democrat, Conservative, Plaid Cymru and Independent councillors. After the election the leadership returned to the Labour Party, led by councillor Mel Nott.

The council elections on 5 May 2017 saw Labour lose its majority control of the council with, for example, three of the four Brackla seats being taken by the Conservatives from Labour. Keith Edwards and Ross Thomas, who'd been deselected by Labour for voting against the proposed local authority merger, won as Independents in Maesteg.

In May 2022 Labour regained a majority and control of the council, though their majority was reduced following the Bridgend Central by-election on 11 August.

Premises
The council is based at the Civic Offices on Angel Street in Bridgend, on the banks of the River Ogmore. The building was built in 1986 for the council's predecessor, Ogwr Borough Council.

Electoral divisions

Prior to May 2022, the county borough was divided into 39 electoral wards.

Since the 2022 local elections the county borough has been divided into 28 electoral wards electing 51 councillors. Some communities also have their own elected council and community wards. The following table lists council wards, communities and associated community wards. Communities with a community council are indicated with a '*':

* = Communities which elect a community council

Arms

See also
Ogwr Borough Council

References

External links
Bridgend County Borough Council

Politics of Bridgend County Borough
Bridgend
1996 establishments in Wales